Workshop on Numerical Ranges and Numerical Radii (WONRA) is a biennial workshop series on numerical ranges and numerical radii which began in 1992.

About
Numerical ranges and numerical radii are useful in the study of matrix and operator theory.
These topics have applications in many subjects in pure and applied mathematics, such as
quadratic forms, Banach spaces, dilation theory, control theory, numerical analysis, quantum information science.

History
In the early 1970s, numerical range workshops were organized by Frank Bonsall and John Duncan. More activities were started in early 1990s, including the biennial workshop series, which began in 1992,
and special issues devoted to this workshop were published.

Workshops

Symposium in conferences

References

External links
 WONRA 2008 – Williamsburg, VA, USA
 WONRA 2010 – Krakow, Poland
 WONRA 2012 – Kaohsiung, Taiwan
 WONRA 2014 – Sanya, China
 WONRA 2016 – Taipei, Taiwan
 WONRA 2018 – Munich, Germany
 WONRA 2019 - Kawagoe, Japan
 WONRA 2023 - Coimbra, Portugal
 

Mathematics conferences
Matrix theory
Operator theory
Functional analysis
Mathematical analysis